I chartopaichtra (The Card Player) is a 1964 Greek black-and-white film starring Rena Vlachopoulou and Lambros Konstantaras.  The film made 534,086 tickets in Athens.

Plot
Aleka (Rena Vlahopoulou) is a middle-aged lady married to a businessman (Lambros Konstantaras) and she is obsessed with gambling. Her husband and children make several attempts to curb her excessive playing which has started to affect her family and her economic status.

Cast
 Rena Vlahopoulou ..... Aleka Oikonomidi
 Lambros Konstantaras ..... Andreas Oikonomidis
 Kostas Voutsas ..... Lakis Oikonomidis
 Lili Papagianni ..... Lele
 Sapfo Notara ..... Marigo
 Chloe Liaskou ..... Nina Oikonomidi
 Giorgos Vrasivanopoulos ..... Giannakis
 Angelos Mavropoulos ..... general
 Nikos Fermas ..... Vangos Kapsouris
 Nikitas Platis ..... Paminos Stravokanis
 Nassos Kedrakas ..... Nikolopoulos
 Raphael Denogias ..... Evangelopoulos
 Giannis Bertos ..... doctor

Other
Photographer: Nikos Dimopoulos
Operator: Vassilis Vassiliadis
Music: Mimis Plessas
Presenter: Petros Lykas
Scenic producer: Markos Zervas
Make-up: Nikos Xepapadakos
Audio: Giannis Fisher
Style: Markos Zervas
Dancers: Fotis Metaxopoulos, Viky Tzinieri
Associate producer: Markos Zervas
Machine audio: G. Mihaloudis

See also
List of Greek films

External links

1964 films
1960s Greek-language films
1964 comedy films
Greek black-and-white films
Greek comedy films
Films directed by Giannis Dalianidis